Tim Hunter (born March 3, 1954) is a retired Canadian-American soccer player who played professionally in the North American Soccer League.

Born in Canada, Hunter and his brother Paul grew up in Westport, Connecticut. In 1971, he graduated from Staples High School where he was a member of four consecutive state championship soccer teams. In 2008, he was voted among the best midfielders and forwards to play for the school's soccer team.  Hunter attended the University of Connecticut where he played on the men's soccer team from 1972 to 1974.  He was a 1972 and 1974 Honorable Mention (third team) All American. Hunter was on the American team at the 1975 Pan American Games.

In 1975, Hunter first played with the Connecticut Yankees of the ASL before signing with the Boston Minutemen of the North American Soccer League.  In 1977, he began the season with the Connecticut Bicentennials before moving to Team Hawaii.  He finished his career in 1978 with the New England Tea Men.

He was inducted into the Connecticut State Soccer Hall of Fame in 2004 and the Fairfield County Sports Hall of Fame in 2008.

References

External links
 NASL/MISL stats

1955 births
Living people
Soccer players from Toronto
Canadian soccer players
Canadian emigrants to the United States
American soccer players
Boston Minutemen players
Connecticut Bicentennials players
New England Tea Men players
North American Soccer League (1968–1984) players
North American Soccer League (1968–1984) indoor players
Team Hawaii players
UConn Huskies men's soccer players
Soccer players from Connecticut
American Soccer League (1933–1983) players
Connecticut Wildcats soccer players
Association football defenders
Association football forwards
Staples High School alumni
Footballers at the 1975 Pan American Games
Pan American Games competitors for the United States